Blackwell Northern Gateway Railroad (BNGR) is a short-line railroad headquartered in Blackwell, Oklahoma. It is owned by the Blackwell Industrial Authority (BIA) and the Oklahoma Department of Transportation (ODOT), and operated by US Rail Partners, Ltd.

The BGNR was a replacement for The Blackwell and Northern Railway (BNR), which started service over the same line on November 4, 2002, and which was in turn the replacement for the prior operator, the South Kansas and Oklahoma Railroad.  The BNGR was chartered in Oklahoma on October 31, 2005,  contracted to replace the BNR in late 2005, and began operating January 2, 2006.  As of 2021, Scott Nauer was President.  It is an employer for the purposes of the Railroad Retirement Act.

It operates 35.26 miles of line from Blackwell to Hunnewell, Kansas, with trackage rights to Wellington, Kansas.  It interchanges with the BNSF at Wellington, and (via the BNSF) with Union Pacific.  It also generates revenue storing railcars for larger railroads.  It had 8 employees as of 2017.

When the region experienced flooding in May of 2019, the line was severely damaged in areas around Blackwell, Braman, Oklahoma, and South Haven, Kansas.  The line was temporarily shut down since the owners could not immediately afford to make all the needed repairs.

References

External links

 US Rail Partners, Ltd. 
 Blackwell Northern Gateway Railroad
 Blackwell Industrial Authority

Oklahoma railroads
Kansas railroads